Martin Richards may refer to:

 Martin Richards (computer scientist) (born 1940), British computer scientist
 Martin Richards (police officer) (born 1959), British Chief Constable
 Martin Richards (producer) (1932–2012), American film producer
 Martin Richards (psychologist) (born 1940), British psychologist

See also
Martin Richard (disambiguation)